Nazneen is an Indian Bollywood actress who was active in the 1970s and 1980s. She was born on (23 February 1958) in Kolkata and studied in Lucknow before moving to Mumbai with her parents. She was cast in Sa-Re-Ga-Ma-Pa (1972) after meeting an assistant to director Satyen Bose at a party. She subsequently played in the hit movies Kora Kagaz (1974), Chalte Chalte (1976) and Dildaar (1977).
Nazneen starred in the hit television series Mahabharat produced by B.R Chopra as Kunti, the mother of the Pandava  brothers.

Early life
Nazneen was born into a Muslim family. Her father owned a printing press. She did her schooling from Hill Grange High School. Actress Neetu Singh went to the same school as her. Neetu would invite her to her mother’s flat for lunch.

Career
At a party hosted by a relative of hers, producer Yusuf Teendarwajawalla, who made Mere Humsafar (1970), and director Satyen Bose offered her a role in Sa-Re-Ga-Ma-Pa (1972), which he directed.

Nazneen was signed for two more films to be directed by Satyen Bose but they were never made. But working under the veteran director did help her a lot. Satyen Bose also wanted Nazneen to have a screen name. He had suggested Suparna, and then somebody suggested Sonali. However, she chose to be herself, Nazneen.

In 1974 she acted in Kora Kagaz, which won her critical acclaim. In the film she played  Jaya Bachchan's sister. After Kora Kaagaz she got several offers, but everyone said "there was a wonderful role of a sister". "They all thought I was good only for goody-goody roles", Nazneen said in an interview conducted in 1976.

Nazneen declined all those offers. She was already playing the leading lady in a few "B" class films and the producers of these films told Nazneen if she accepted the sisters’ roles their films would suffer at the box office.

Filmography

Acting roles 
Sa-Re-Ga-Ma-Pa (1972)
Mere Garib Nawaz (1973)
Nirdosh (1973)
Naya Din Nai Raat (1974)
Kora Kagaz (1974)
Ranga Khush (1975)
Chalte Chalte (1976)
Fauji (1976)
Yaari Zindabad (1976)
Chaalu Mera Naam (1977)
Dildaar (1977)
Haiwan (1977)
Bin Phere Hum Tere (1979)
Adventures of Aladdin (1979)
Oh Bewafaa (1980)
Ek Duuje Ke Liye (1981)
Ek Hi Bhool (1981)
Khuda Kasam (1981) as Geeta Singh
Waqt ki Dewar (1981)
Chambal Ke Daku (1982)
Do Ustad (1982)
Shekhar Mera Naam (1983)
Aadamkhor (1986)
Nazneen also played the role of Kunti (mother of Karna and the Pandava brothers) in the 1988 TV serial Mahabharat.

References

External links

Indian film actresses
Indian television actresses 
20th-century Indian actresses
Living people
1958 births
Actresses from West Bengal
Hill Grange High School alumni